is the tallest mountain in the Teshio Mountains. It is located on the border of Haboro and Horokanai, Hokkaidō, Japan.

References
 Geographical Survey Institute

Mountains of Hokkaido